Judson Freeman Clark (27 July 1870, Queens County, Prince Edward Island – 26 July 1942, Los Angeles) was a Canadian forester and mycologist. He is famous for publishing in 1906, what is now known as the International 1/8-Inch Log Rule (for 1/8-inch saw kerf), which he modified in 1917 for 1/4-inch saw kerf.

Biography
After receiving a B.S. in agriculture from the University of Toronto in 1896, Clark taught English and mathematics at the Ontario Agricultural College from 1896 to 1898. In 1898 he matriculated at Cornell University, graduating there with A.M. in 1899 and Ph.D. in botany in 1901. At Cornell University, upon the resignation of Professor Filibert Roth, Clark was appointed assistant professor and, after six months' study in Germany and Switzerland, started work in January 1902. He "handled courses in timber physics, mensuration, dendrology, and silviculture."

Clark resigned in 1903 from Cornell University and worked briefly for the United States Bureau of Forestry, before he was appointed in 1904 a provincial forester in Ontario as a member of the staff of the Crown Lands Department.

For many years he was "the senior member of the firm of consulting foresters, Clark and Lyford, Ltd., in Vancouver, British Columbia."

He married Eva Couch (b. 1872). The marriage produced at least one child, a daughter.

International 1/4-inch log rule

For a 20-foot log:V= (0.995D2 – 1.221D – 1.719), withV= volume in board feet, andD= diameter measured in inches at the small end, inside bark

See also
 Girard form class

Selected publications

 Chapter XXII. Chemistry and toxicology of mushrooms in:

References

External links

1870 births
1942 deaths
Canadian foresters
University of Toronto alumni
Cornell University alumni
Cornell University faculty
People from Queens County, Prince Edward Island